María Fernanda Lauro (born December 2, 1978) is an Argentine sprint canoer. She competed in the mid-2000s.

At the 2004 Summer Olympics in Athens, Lauro was eliminated in the semifinals of the K-1 500 m event.

References
Sports-Reference.com profile

1978 births
Argentine female canoeists
Canoeists at the 2004 Summer Olympics
Canoeists at the 2007 Pan American Games
Living people
Olympic canoeists of Argentina
Pan American Games silver medalists for Argentina
Pan American Games medalists in canoeing
Medalists at the 2007 Pan American Games